The 2010 Delaware Fightin' Blue Hens football team represented the University of Delaware as a member of the Colonial Athletic Association (CAA) during the 2010 NCAA Division I FCS football season. Led by ninth-year head coach K. C. Keeler, the Fightin' Blue Hens compiled an overall record of 12–3 with a mark of 6–2 in conference play, sharing the CAA title with William & Mary. Delaware advanced to the NCAA Division I Football Championship playoffs, where the Fightin' Blue Hens received a first round bye. They beat  Lehigh in the second round, New Hampshire in the quarterfinals, and Georgia Southern in the semifinals before losing to Eastern Washington in the NCAA Division I Championship Game, after leading by 19 points late in the third quarter. The team played home games at Delaware Stadium in Newark, Delaware.

Delaware received one vote in the AP Poll following their wins against Towson and UMass.

Preseason

Preseason awards
 Pat Devlin
Consensus Draft Services Pre-Season NCAA Division I Football Championship Subdivision honorable mention All-American

 Anthony Walters
Consensus Draft Services Pre-Season NCAA Division I Football Championship Subdivision honorable mention All-American

 Anthony Bratton
Preseason All-CAA Football Defense - Safety (as voted on by the head coaches)

Schedule

Delaware was forced to revise their 2010 schedule when two Colonial Athletic Association opponents, the Northeastern Huskies and the Hofstra Pride, discontinued their football programs after the 2009 season.

Awards

Watchlists
 Pat Devlin
Walter Payton Award watchlist
Johnny Unitas Golden Arm Award watchlist

Postseason
 K. C. Keeler (coach)
AFCA FCS Coach of the Year
Liberty Mutual Coach of the Year Award

References

Delaware
Delaware Fightin' Blue Hens football seasons
Colonial Athletic Association football champion seasons
Delaware
Delaware Fightin' Blue Hens football